, stylized as SGGG, is a 2001 role-playing simulation video game developed by Sega Hitmaker and published by Sega for the Dreamcast in Japan. Described as a "Sega simulation", the player takes control of Sega Tarō, who must help save a struggling Sega from losing to its rival DOGMA, who owns 97% of the console market.. Gameplay involves battling employees and other characters throughout various Sega development studios, some being taken from older Sega game franchises. It features many tongue-in-cheek references to Sega and the video game industry, particularly Sony Computer Entertainment and its PlayStation 2 console.

Development was directed by Tez Okano, who developed the game in secret for two years before presenting it to Sega. The company misconstrued the game as a joke at first and dismissed it, however a second presentation impressed them and allowed development to continue. Okano marketed the game himself with a small budget of $200, half of which he spent on a wrestling mask to promote the game. Several characters, such as Segata Sanshiro and a Ferrari from Out Run, had to be cut for licensing issues. Toei Animation produced the game's animated cutscenes. The game was initially exclusive to the Sega Direct online service, its popularity eventually warranting a physical release. It was produced on a small budget.

Segagaga received a favorable reception from critics, being commended for its humor, gameplay and bizarre nature, alongside its usage of various Sega franchises and for poking fun at the industry itself. One critic labeled the game as the "swan song" of the Dreamcast. It is one of the last games released for the system, published two days before the Dreamcast's discontinuation on March 31.

Gameplay

Segagaga is a role-playing simulation video game, described as a "Sega simulation". Controlling the young Sega Tarō, the player is tasked with saving a struggling Sega from losing the console market to their rival DOGMA. The player must progress through various Sega development studios and fight various employees, who due to the stress and pressure brought on by tight work constraints have turned into mutants. Unlike other role-playing games, Tarō "attacks" by shouting verbal abuses and insults, such as telling them their game is terrible or they will never get a girlfriend. Enemies have a "will meter" that weakens as the player deals more insults towards them, and will win the fight once it fully drains. Failing to defeat an enemy will result in a month of development time being lost, which will become critical as the game progresses.

Once an enemy is defeated, they may become willing to ally with the player and aid them in their adventure. Should the defeated enemy accept, the player will need to quickly answer questions within a ten-second timer, such as how much the employee will make and what work conditions there are. If the player succeeds, they can place the new employee into one of four development group positions, including director, designer, planner, and programmer — development teams will increase the player's stamina and "creativity", detrimental to later sections of the game. Based on player decisions, teams can either make a small number of high-quality games or quickly produce shovelware games to hopefully generate profit. The game will end after three years of development time are completed; the ending is based on the player's performance.

A notable feature of Segagaga is its many cameos and callbacks to other Sega game franchises, alongside tongue-in-cheek parodies of the game industry itself. Tarō will come across numerous Sega characters throughout the game, including Sonic the Hedgehog, Ristar, Alex Kidd, Sir Pepper III from Clockwork Knight, Nei from Phantasy Star 2, Opa-Opa from Fantasy Zone, the Bad Brothers from Golden Axe, Panda from Baku Baku Animal, Amigo from Samba de Amigo, and the F-14 Tomcat from After Burner. Towards the end of the game, Tarō pilots a starship known as the "R-720", a nod to the R-360 arcade cabinet, into outer space that features a shoot'em up level reminiscent of Thunder Force. Tarō will fight various mechs designed after older Sega game consoles, such as the Sega Genesis and Master System. The story takes place in the year 2025, depicting Sega with having only a 3% share of the console market, the other 97% being owned by their rival DOGMA — a spoof of Sega's rival Sony Interactive Entertainment, featuring parodies of the PlayStation 2 and other Sony characters. To help save the company from total collapse, Sega establishes "Project Segagaga", led by company newcomers Sega Tarō and Yayoi Haneda in order to assist Sega in claiming 100% of the market and achieving world domination.

Development

Segagaga was directed and designed by Tez Okano, who worked on the game in secret for two years before presenting it to the company, fearing that "anything could have happened" if the project was revealed. When it was initially shown off, Sega's management misconstrued the game as a sort of joke, and dismissed the game. When Okano presented the game again, Sega Hitmaker president Hisao Oguchi became impressed and allowed development of the game to continue. The game was produced on a small budget. Toei Animation produced the opening and cutscenes; because of the budget, Okano was given a small discount.

Development was handled by Sega Hitmaker, a production studio best known for titles such as Virtua Tennis and Crazy Taxi. The game was originally titled Sega Sega, later being changed to Segagaga to make the word "Sega" sound less intrusive. Early versions of the game had nearly 300 production issues, some of which caused characters to be removed from the game entirely, such as the Japanese Sega Saturn mascot Segata Sanshiro and the Ferrari from Out Run. Okano utilized a large number of Sega franchises due to their popularity and for them being freely available to use. Once the finished product was presented, Sega felt that it didn't cast a negative impression on the company and authorized its release.

Release
Okano was given a meager $200 budget to market the game; roughly half of it was spent on a wrestling mask to promote the game. He set up signing events at locations across Akihabara, rewarding those who visited all four of them. Assisting him was Sega public relations head Tadashi Takezaki and Sega AM3 employee Taku Sasahara to help promote it, managing to garner a full-page newspaper story on the game. Segagaga was released in Japan on March 29, 2001, as an exclusive for the Sega Direct online service. A promotional Dreamcast VMU memory card, designed after the exterior of the Mega Drive, was released the same day. On May 1, the Japan Adult Children's Association ordered Sega to remove the game from the service due to one of the game's characters being called "Adult Children", a Japanese term that can be used to refer to a child that grew up from an alcoholic parent; Sega issued a public apology and reissued an altered version of the game that replaced the name of the character. The popularity of the game lead to the release of a physical version, and later a budget version. A special collector's box was also made that contained the game, a Segagaga shirt, notebook, and enamel pins with the Segagaga, Sega Mark III, Mega Drive, Game Gear, Saturn, and Dreamcast logos.

The Thunder Force-inspired shoot'em up level in Segagaga was later released for Japanese mobile phones as a standalone game on June 2, 2005, for the Sega Ages mobile service, titled Segagaga R-720. It featured additional enemies and bosses not found in the Dreamcast game, such as having a giant Sega Saturn as a boss. The soundtrack for Segagaga has been released several times; the first of these was split into two different volumes, titled Segagaga Soundtrack Blue Edition and Segagaga Soundtrack Red Edition, were both jointly released in Japan in December 2001. The second, Segagaga 5 Original Soundtrack, was released on July 20, 2006, in Japan to commemorate the five-year anniversary of the game's release - this album was later split into two volumes and released digitally for both iTunes and Amazon Music in 2015.

Reception

Likely due to its late release in the Dreamcast's lifespan, Segagaga was not a commercial success. In its first week of release, the game sold an estimated 18,000 copies. In total, it has sold little over 34,000 copies.

Official Dreamcast Magazine US applauded the game's sense of humor and bizarre premise, saying that its design and amount of content "will surprise many". They also expressed disappointment towards the lack of an overseas release. Japanese publication Famitsu praised its usage of older Sega game characters and unique setting, alongside its role-playing elements and humor towards the game industry as a whole, notably with DOGMA being a spoof of Sony, Sega's then-biggest rival. In a more negative light, Dreamcast Magazine Japan commended the game for its "ambitious" premise, but felt that its humor would only really be appreciated by hardcore Sega fans and would fall short to those that weren't. They unfavorably compared its gameplay to Sakura Wars 3: Is Paris Burning?, recommending that RPG enthusiasts instead buy that game instead of Segagaga.

In a 2009 retrospective review, Kurt Kalata of Hardcore Gaming 101 commended Segagaga for its gameplay and humor, namely for poking fun at the Japanese video game industry at the time and for presenting a somber look towards the company as they were approaching a near-collapse. He also liked the game's large usage of Sega fanservice and its bizarre, outlandish battle system, as well as for being a generally import-friendly game despite its large usage of Japanese. Kalata concluded his review writing: "Anyone willing to brave the Japanese language will find one of the most original, self-referential titles ever made, a stroke of genius that's a virtual dream come true for Sega fans." Retro Gamer magazine stated in 2020 that the game "remains a work of crazy reflexive genius, and demands to be played by anyone with even a passing interest in games industry history", highly-praising its strange battle system and tongue'n cheek references to the then-collapsing company. Eurogamers Martin Robinson listed it as one of Sega's stranger video game products for its self-awareness and humor, writing: "The final days of Sega's final console had a fatalistic air to them, and Segaga punctured all that with brilliant self-awareness." Writing for GamesRadar+, Chris Antista described it as an "amazingly bizarre swan song" for the Dreamcast, and expressed interest that Sega re-release the game for digital distribution services such as Xbox Live.

Notes

References

External links
 

2001 video games
Crossover role-playing video games
Dreamcast games
Dreamcast-only games
Japan-exclusive video games
Parody video games
Role-playing video games
Sega-AM3 games
Self-reflexive video games
Video games developed in Japan
Video games about video games
Single-player video games
Satirical video games